U-139, originally designated "Project 46", was a class of large, long-range U-boats built during World War I by the Kaiserliche Marine.

Description
Three large U-cruisers, designated Type 139, were ordered from Germaniawerft of Kiel, in August 1916. They carried a large enough complement to furnish captured vessels with prize crews and their intended purpose was to capture or destroy merchant ships on the surface; their large-calibre deck guns and comparatively high speed allowed them to engage even armed merchant vessels.

Unlike the earlier Type U-151 submarines (originally designed as merchant submarines to evade naval blockades), the Type 139 was designed from the outset for combat service. Four bow and two stern torpedo tubes were fitted, but the main armament was the two 15 cm deck guns, which could be laid on target by a rangefinder on the aft section of the bridge. The superstructure was also raised by  so that a shell hitting it would not penetrate the pressure hull.

A Type 139 U-boat cost 8.7 million Marks at the time, the 15 cm guns accounting for around 7% of the cost.

Service
The Type 139 submarines were dispatched on long-range missions, south across the Equator, and to the west across the Atlantic, operating independently.

Lothar von Arnauld de la Perière commanded U-139, the first of the class, and named the submarine Kapitänleutnant Schweiger, after Walther Schwieger, who had sunk  in 1915. Under von Arnauld, U-139 sank four ships from May 1918, and sank the last ship to fall to a Type 139 U-boat in World War I on 14 October 1918.

List of Type U 139 submarines 
Three Type U 139 submarines were built, all of which were commissioned into the Kaiserliche Marine.

  (Kapitänleutnant Schwieger)
  (Kapitänleutnant Kophamel)

References

Bibliography

External links
 

Submarine classes
 
World War I submarines of Germany